This is a list of notable international wushu competitions hosted by the International Wushu Federation (IWUF) and its official continental organisations.

Note: Most competitions with the "Kung Fu Championships" label were originally named "Traditional Wushu Championships" leading up to 2017.

International 
All major International wushu competitions are hosted by the IWUF and are aided by continental or national organisations.

Official events 

 World Wushu Championships
 World Junior Wushu Championships
 World Kung Fu Championships
 World Taijiquan Championships
 Taolu World Cup
 Sanshou World Cup

Multi-sport events 

 Wushu at the World Games
 Wushu at the World Combat Games
 Wushu at the Summer Universiade
 FISU World University Wushu Championships

Historical / One-off events 

 2008 Beijing Wushu Tournament
 2014 Nanjing Youth Wushu Tournament

Asia 
All prominent continental wushu competitions in Asia are hosted by the Wushu Federation of Asia (WFA).

Official events 

 Asian Wushu Championships
 Asian Junior Wushu Championships
 Asian Kung Fu Championships
 Asian Sanda Cup

Multi-sport events 

 Asian Games
 Southeast Asian Games
 South Asian Games

Historical 

 East Asian Games
 Asian Indoor and Martial Arts Games
 Wushu at the Islamic Solidarity Games

Africa

Primary Events 
African Wushu Championships
African Wushu Cup Championships
African Traditional Wushu Championships

Multi-Sport Events 

 African Youth Games

Europe 
All prominent wushu competitions in Europe are organised by the European Wushu Federation (EWUF) which was established in 1985, making it the first international or continental wushu organization ever established.

 European Wushu Championships
 European Traditional Wushu (Kungfu) Championships
 European Taijiquan and Internal Styles Wushu Championships

Oceania 
All major continental wushu competitions throughout Oceania are organised by the Oceania Kung Fu Wushu Federation (OKWF).

 Oceania Wushu Championships

Pan America 
All major continental wushu competitions throughout North and South America are organised by the Pan American Wushu Federation (PAWF).

Official events 

 Pan American Wushu Championships
 Pan American Kung Fu and Taijiquan Championships

Historical 

 Bolivarian Games

References 

Wushu competitions